Henry Francis Hoobin (February 15, 1879 – July 20, 1921) was a Canadian lacrosse player. He was born in Montreal, Quebec, Canada.

Early life
Henry's father, John Hoobin, was a member of the Shamrocks Lacrosse Club. In the late 1890s, having been taught to play the sport by his father, Henry joined his father's lacrosse team. In 1907, Henry retired from the sport due to an injured knee, but returned to the game when he selected to represent Canada in lacrosse at the 1908 Summer Olympics.

1908 Summer Olympics
Henry won a gold medal against Great Britain at the 1908 Summer Olympics in London, as a member of the Canadian lacrosse team. At the time he was signed for the Montreal Shamrocks in the attack wing position.

References

1879 births
1921 deaths
Lacrosse players at the 1908 Summer Olympics
Olympic lacrosse players of Canada
Canadian lacrosse players
Sportspeople from Montreal
Olympic gold medalists for Canada